Dave B. Fern is an American politician from Montana. Fern is a Democratic member of Montana House of Representatives for  District 5.

Career 
Fern has served on the Whitefish School District board of trustees.

On November 8, 2016, Fern won the election and became a Democratic member of Montana House of Representatives for District 5. Fern defeated Chet Billi with 56.74% of the votes. On November 6, 2018, as an incumbent, Fern won the election and continued serving District 5. Fern defeated Cindy Dyson with 69.12% of the votes.

Personal life 
Fern's wife is Heather Fern. They have three children. Fern and his family live in Whitefish, Montana.

See also 
 Montana House of Representatives, District 5

References

External links 
 Dave Fern at ballotpedia.org
 List of candidates for Montana Legislature (March 12, 2012

Living people
Democratic Party members of the Montana House of Representatives
People from Whitefish, Montana
Year of birth missing (living people)
21st-century American politicians